Queenie was an elephant who was used to give rides for children at Melbourne Zoo for 40 years.

Queenie was a very popular exhibit, with large crowds of children often gathering around her enclosure even when she was not giving rides. She was often teased by children and her keeper, Andrew Wilkie, said she would retaliate by using her trunk to "tumble such trespassers over in the dust". 
"On one occasion, a group of about fifteen schoolboys were teasing Queenie by offering her nuts and fruit in turn and then withdrawing the food just as she reached for it. This game continued for a while until the elephant retreated to the pool behind her house. She returned some minutes later and, imitating their behaviour, held out her trunk to each boy in turn, withdrawing it before they would touch it. The boys were delighted with this variation of the game until, as if carrying out a pre-planned attack, she soaked them all thoroughly with a well-aimed spray of dirty water from her pool."

She was euthanized in 1945 after crushing keeper Wilfred Lawson to death.

See also
 List of individual elephants

References

Sources

Queenie's last ride, The Age, August 10, 2006.
Queenie: One Elephant's Story, by Corinne Fenton and illustrated by Peter Gouldthorpe (Black Dog Books) - a children's story.
Melbourne Zoo - Queenie

Individual elephants
History of Melbourne
1944 animal deaths
Individual animals in Australia